Aatagadharaa Siva is a 2018 Indian Telugu-language slice of life film directed by Chandra Siddhartha and starring Kannada actor Doddanna (in his only Telugu film to date) and debutante Uday Shankar in the lead roles. This film is a remake of the 2016 Kannada film Rama Rama Re....

Plot 
The escaped convict Babji (Uday Shankar) lands in a four-wheeler, being driven by Jangayya who has been called by the prison authorities to hang the former. Oblivious of each other’s identities, the journey goes on while a series of characters bump into them.

Cast 
Doddanna as Jangayya
Uday Shankar as Babji
Hyper Aadi as Aadhi
Chammak Chandra
 Chalaki Chanti
 Rocket Raghava
 Jwala Koti

Production 
Kannada film producer Rockline Venkatesh agreed to produce the film under his banner Rockline Entertainments.

Release 
The film was scheduled to release on 20 July 2018 but the release date was advanced to 18 July 2018.

Awards and nominations

Reception 
The Hindu wrote that "Screenplay is tight and holds the film together. The run time of the film is a huge advantage and if you are bored of formula stuff, go for this".

References 

2018 films
Telugu remakes of Kannada films
2010s Telugu-language films
Films shot in Hyderabad, India